Savinskaya is a rural locality (a village) in Morzhegorskoye Rural Settlement of Vinogradovsky District, Arkhangelsk Oblast, Russia. The population was 7 as of 2010.

Geography 
Savinskaya is located on the Severnaya Dvina River, 46 km northwest of Bereznik (the district's administrative centre) by road. Morzhegory is the nearest rural locality.

References 

Rural localities in Vinogradovsky District